Tam Phước may refer to several places in Vietnam, including:

Tam Phước, Biên Hòa, a ward of Biên Hòa
Tam Phước, Bến Tre, a commune of Châu Thành District, Bến Tre
Tam Phước, Bà Rịa–Vũng Tàu, a commune of Long Điền District
Tam Phước, Quảng Nam, a commune of Phú Ninh District